Heron Foods Ltd. (formerly Heron Frozen Foods Ltd and Grindells Butchers Ltd) is an English retail chain founded in 1979 and based in Melton with 293 stores as of 1 July 2020.

It primarily sells frozen food, but has a wide range of ambient and chilled stock with named brands including Muller, Birds Eye and McCain Foods, as well as several lines using the Heron Foods brand.

B&M announced in August 2017 that it had purchased Heron Foods for £152 million, a deal that was described as a "no brainer" by B&M's CEO Simon Arora.

History

The company was first registered in October 1978 as Grindells Butchers. The first store was opened by the Grindell family on Holderness Road, Hull in 1979.

In 1981 the company changed name to Heron Frozen Foods. Shortly after Anthony Grindell sold the business to his sister and her family – the Heucks.

In 1999 Heron Foods bought 17 Dawn Til Dusk convenience stores after that chain went into receivership, bringing its total number of stores to over 100. Malcolm and Sheila Heuck had a joint controlling interest in the company from the beginning, but in February 2003, having reached retirement age, they sold their stake to management; from that point, the company was run by their sons Andrew, David and Michael.

In September 2012 Heron Foods agreed to buy the Cooltrader frozen foods business from Iceland. The deal included 54 of the 58 shops and the depot and head office of Cooltrader. The acquired Cooltrader outlets were converted to the Heron Foods brand.

In August 2017, it was announced that Heron Foods had been sold to B&M for £152 million. A number of new branches have been opened under the new B&M Express facia.

Operations
The company's head office is at Melton in the East Riding of Yorkshire and it has around 250 outlets which are mostly located throughout the North of England and the Midlands. Heron Foods has developed its business in selling frozen and convenience store goods at a discount, the majority of which are household brands. Heron occupies nine former Woolworth's locations.

References

External links
Official website

Retail companies of the United Kingdom
Companies based in the East Riding of Yorkshire
Retail companies established in 1979
Supermarkets of the United Kingdom
1979 establishments in England
Companies established in 1979